Hussein Adel Madani (died 3 October 2019) was an Iraqi cartoonist and political activist.
He was a supporter of the 2018–19 Iraqi protests and took part in them. He was killed with his wife by unknown masked gunmen at his home on 3 October 2019, at the time of the protests. It is not known who was behind their killings and if their death was linked to the protests.

References

Iraqi cartoonists
Place of birth missing
2019 deaths
Place of death missing
Year of birth missing